John Wood (died 1458) was an English politician.

Wood was evidently a close relative of John Atte Wode , perhaps his son (perhaps illegitimate). Upon Atte Wode's death in 1391, his properties were inherited by Sir John Beauchamp , but after Beauchamp's death in 1420, they were conveyed to Wood.

Wood was elected MP for Worcester in May 1413, knight of the shire for Worcestershire in November 1414, Worcester again in 1415 and March 1416, and Worcestershire again in May 1421, 1423, 1429, 1433 and 1435.

He also served as Alnager for Worcestershire from Michaelmas 1405 to 1432, Bailiff for Worcester 1416–17, Escheator for Worcestershire 1416–17, 1424–26 and 1431–32, a JP in Worcestershire 1417–1458, and Deputy Sheriff of Worcestershire 1425–1426.

References

1458 deaths
English MPs May 1413
English MPs November 1414
English MPs 1415
English MPs March 1416
English MPs May 1421
English MPs 1423
English MPs 1429
English MPs 1433
English MPs 1435
Members of the Parliament of England for Worcester
Members of the Parliament of England for Worcestershire
English justices of the peace
Alnagers
Bailiffs
Escheators